The International Tracks is a 1984 EP collecting various singles and remixed tracks by Juluka, a South African band led by Johnny Clegg and Sipho Mchunu. The songs on this album had all been previously released internationally but not in South Africa; hence the title.  The cover is the same as Stand Your Ground but with a slightly different track listing, including two dance mixes and excluding four songs previously released on the 1983 album Work For All.

Track listing 

 Kilimanjaro 3:39
 Look into the Mirror 3:38
 Fever 3:41
 Crazy Woman 4:15
 Umbaqanga Music 3:33
 Fever - dance mix 6:27
 Kilimanjaro - dance mix 5:38

Total: 31:06

External links
Samples on Juluka website (archived)

Juluka albums
1984 compilation albums